Karlik may refer to the following:

People
Karlik (name)

Places
Karlík, Czech Republic
Karlık, Şuhut, Afyonkarahisar Province, Turkey
Karlık, Yüreğir, Adana Province, Turkey
Karlık, Taşova, Amasya Province, Turkey

See also

Karlikh, Iran
Kallik (disambiguation)
Karik (disambiguation)
Karluk (disambiguation)
Karnik (disambiguation)
Kartik (disambiguation)
Little Longnose (Russian: Ка́рлик Нос, Karlik Nos), a 2003 Russian animated film